Kwun Tong Garden Estate, or Garden Estate, is a public housing estate in Ngau Tau Kok, Kwun Tong, Kowloon, Hong Kong, developed by the Hong Kong Housing Society, near the MTR Kwun Tong line's Ngau Tau Kok station. It is the largest Housing Society estate by number of flats (4,921).

It was the first public housing estate in Kwun Tong District. It comprises five blocks built in 1965 and 1967 respectively, plus Lotus Tower, which comprises four blocks built on the site of the earliest Garden Estate blocks.

Kwun Tong Garden Estate was built by the Hong Kong Housing Society between the 1950s and 1960s to accommodate the workers working in the industrial area on the newly reclaimed land along Kwun Tong harbourfront. 7 blocks of Phase 1 were completed in 1958 and 1959, while 5 blocks of Phase 2 were completed in 1965 and 1967. To cope with the redevelopment project of the estate, Phase 1 blocks were demolished in 1983 and 1987 respectively. They were replaced by the blocks of Lotus Tower built in 1987 (Block 4) and 1990 (Block 1 to 3) respectively.

Demographics
According to the 2016 population by-census, Kwun Tong Garden Estate has a population of 12,578. 97% of the population is Chinese. Median monthly domestic household income is HK$15,500.



Houses

Kwun Tong Garden Estate

Lotus Tower

References

Ngau Tau Kok
Kwun Tong District
Public housing estates in Hong Kong
Housing estates with centralized LPG system in Hong Kong
Residential buildings completed in 1958
Residential buildings completed in 1959
Residential buildings completed in 1965
Residential buildings completed in 1967
Residential buildings completed in 1987
Residential buildings completed in 1990